Henry Walters (15 March 1925 – May 1994) was an English professional footballer who made over 410 appearances in the Football League for Walsall and Barnsley as a wing half or full back.

Personal life 
While a part-time professional footballer with Barnsley, Walters worked as a joiner at Cortonwood Colliery. His son John became a cricketer.

Honours 
Barnsley

 Football League Third Division North: 1954–55

References 

English Football League players
English footballers
Clapton Orient F.C. wartime guest players
Association football fullbacks
Association football wing halves
People from Wath upon Dearne
1925 births
1994 deaths
Wolverhampton Wanderers F.C. players
Walsall F.C. players
Barnsley F.C. players
Wombwell F.C. players
Player-coaches